Diaphus watasei, Watases lanternfish, is a species of lanternfish 
found in the Indo-west Pacific.

Size

Etymology
The fish is named  in honor of biologist Shozaburo Watasé (1862–1929), of the Imperial University of Tokyo, who presented the type specimen to Stanford University.

References

Myctophidae
Taxa named by David Starr Jordan
Taxa named by Edwin Chapin Starks
Fish described in 1904